Road to Hell may refer to:

 The road to hell is paved with good intentions, a proverb
 Road to Hell (film), a 2008 fantasy film
 The Road to Hell, a 1989 album by Chris Rea
 The Road to Hell (song), a 1989 song by Chris Rea
 The Road to Hell: Part 2, a 1999 album by Chris Rea
 The Road to Hell (book), a 1997 book by Michael Maren
 Boiling Point: Road to Hell, a 2005 video game by Atari
 "Road to Hell", a song by Rory Gallagher from Defender
 "Road to Hell", a song by Sleigh Bells from Reign of Terror

See also
 Highway to Hell (disambiguation)
 Rue de la Harpe, formerly called "rue d'Enfer" (literally "street of Hell")